Ramgarh may refer to:

Bangladesh
 Ramgarh Upazila, a sub-district of Khagrachari District

India
 Ramgarh, Bihar, a village near Munger, Bihar
 Ramgarh, Kaimur, a town in Kaimur district, Bihar
 Ramgarh, Uttarakhand, a hill station in Nainital district, Uttarakhand
 Ramgarh, Chhattisgarh, a village and ancient ruins in Ambikapur district, Chhattisgarh
 Ramgarh, Punjab, a village in Jalandhar district, Punjab
 Ramgarhia Bunga, tower in Amritsar, Punjab, India
 Ramgarhia Misl, former Sikh confederacy in India
 Ramgarhia, community of Sikhs in India
 Former name for the town Dindori, Madhya Pradesh
 Former name for Dindori district, Madhya Pradesh

Jammu and Kashmir
 Ramgarh tehsil, in which the village Chak Paras is located
 Ramgarh, Jammu and Kashmir, a town and tehsil headquarters

Jharkhand
 Ramgarh district
 Ramgarh subdivision
 Ramgarh (community development block), a community development block
 Ramgarh (Jharkhand Vidhan Sabha constituency), an electoral constituency
 Ramgarh Cantonment, a town and district headquarters
 Ramgarh Coalfield, a coalfield
 Ramgarh, Dumka, a community development block in Dumka district
 Ramgarh, Dumka (village), a village in Dumka district
 Ramgarh Raj, a major estate in the era of the British Raj

Rajasthan
 Ramgarh, Alwar, in Alwar district
 Ramgarh, Dantaramgarh, a town in Dantaramgarh tehsil of Sikar district
 Jamwa Ramgarh, a subdivision of the Jaipur district
 Ramgarh, Hanumangarh, a village in Hanumangarh district
 Ramgarh, Sikar, a city and municipality in Fathepur tehsil of Sikar district
 Ramgarh crater, a meteor crater near village Ramgarh in Baron district
 Ramgarh Lake, an artificial lake situated near Jaipur city

Fictional places
 Ramgarh, the village in the story Sholay

See also
 Ram (given name)